Metro Brands, previously known as Metro Shoes, is an Indian multi-brand footwear retail company based in Mumbai. Metro Brands operates from a network of 598 Metro showrooms across 136 cities in India.

History
Metro started as a standalone shoe store in 1955 in Colaba, Mumbai. It was named after the Metro Cinema which was located nearby. The company was incorporated in January 1977 as Metro Shoes.

In 2013, the company announced that it was able to expand the number of its retails stores due to low rental rates, particularly in tier II cities.

In 2015, Metro signed an agreement with Crocs to open exclusive Crocs stores in India.

In December 2021, the company launched its  initial public offering (IPO).

Controversy
In December 1996, Managing Director Rafique Malik, was among several businessmen and politicians arrested by Mumbai Police on charges of misappropriation of concessionary funds allocated to cobblers and artisans. The case is sub judice as of 2018.

References

External links
Metro Shoes
Mochi Shoes
Walkway Shoes
FitFlop

Retail companies of India
Companies based in Mumbai
Retail companies established in 1947
Shoe companies of India
Footwear retailers
Indian brands
Indian companies established in 1947
Indian companies established in 1977